Gabriela Matečná (born 28 November 1964 in Poprad) is a Slovak agriculturalist and politician. Between 2016 and 2020, she served as the Minister of Agriculture and Rural Development. Since 2018, she is a member of the Slovak National Party.

Early life 
Matečná graduated from the Slovak University of Agriculture. Since 2008, she worked at the Slovak Land Fund - the government agency responsible for managing government owned agricultural land. In 2012, she became the CEO of the Fund as a nominee of the Direction – Slovak Social Democracy party. As a CEO, she faced accusations of helping people connected to the Prime Minister Robert Fico to buy lucrative state-owned land.

Political career 
Matečná became the Minister of Agriculture in 2016 as a nominee, but not a member of, the Slovak National Party. She became a member of the party in 2018. After the Slovak National Party failed to pass the representation threshold in the 2020 Slovak parliamentary election, she retired from politics.

References

People from Poprad
Slovak National Party politicians
Agriculture ministers of Slovakia
Living people
1964 births
Women government ministers of Slovakia